Brisbin is an unincorporated community in Park County, Montana, United States.

Notes

}

Unincorporated communities in Park County, Montana
Unincorporated communities in Montana